Acquitted is a 1916 American silent mystery film produced by the Fine Arts Film Company and distributed by Triangle Film Corporation. Paul Powell directed a screenplay by Roy Somerville based on a 1907 short story by Mary Roberts Rinehart. Tod Browning served as an uncredited writer.

This film marks the first starring role of Wilfred Lucas, and may mark Bessie Love's film debut. The film is presumed lost, possibly due to the 1965 MGM vault fire.

Plot 

The police accuse innocent bookkeeper John Carter (Lucas) of having committed the murder of a cashier. A reporter, who is in love with Carter's daughter (Love), proves that Carter is innocent. After a time, Carter's daughter convinces his former employer to hire him back.

Cast

Production 
Bessie Love wore some of her own clothing as her wardrobe in the film.

Release and reception 

The film was heavily censored in Ohio, with scenes of violence and drug sales and use removed before distribution.

The film was well-reviewed. Wilfred Lucas received positive reviews for his performance in the lead role, as did Powell's direction. Bessie Love was positively likened to her contemporaries Mary Pickford and Mae Marsh.

References 
Citations

Works cited

External links 

 
 
 
 
 

1910s mystery drama films
1916 lost films
1916 films
American black-and-white films
American silent feature films
Films based on short fiction
Films directed by Paul Powell (director)
Films based on works by Mary Roberts Rinehart
Lost American films
American mystery drama films
Triangle Film Corporation films
Lost drama films
1916 drama films
1910s American films
Silent American drama films
Silent mystery films